Hansika's Love Shaadi Drama is a 2023 Indian reality TV show on Disney+ Hotstar that covers the wedding of Indian actor Hansika Motwani and Sohael Kathuriya. Produced under the banner of Happy Unicorn, Hotstar, the sereies was released on 10 February 2023 and also dubbed in other languages like English, Tamil, and Telugu.

Release 
The teaser of the show was unveiled by Hansika on her social media platforms on 31 January 2023.

Reception 
Archika Khurana at The Times of India rated the series 2/5, stating "In a nutshell, Motwani is brave for taking control of her wedding narrative, but this docuseries is nothing more than a showcase of celebrity wedding shenanigans. So, if you're a fan of Hansika and want to watch the glam wedding, the show will pique your interest and keep you glued to your screen every Friday for the next episode. Others should look for what they are most interested in."

Namrata Thakkar of Rediff.com gave 2 stars out of 5 and wrote "All in all, the first episode of Hansika's Love Shaadi Drama is decent with a bit of drama and glam. Hopefully, the next episodes will be more dramatic to keep us hooked."

Sunidhi Prajapat of OTT Play in her review stated "Hansika's Love Shaadi Drama is definitely a gorgeous fairytale with indeed a gigantic amount of drama."

Criticism 
Hansika was heavily criticized for turning her wedding into a web series.

References

External links 

 

Hindi-language web series